Albania was scheduled to participate in the Eurovision Song Contest 2020 in Rotterdam, the Netherlands, with the song "Fall from the Sky" performed by Arilena Ara. In March 2020, the European Broadcasting Union (EBU) announced the contest's cancellation due to the pandemic of the coronavirus disease 2019 (COVID-19) and its rapid spread across Europe.

Background 

The first entry was performed by Anjeza Shahini with the song "The Image of You" and finished in the seventh place, Albania's second-highest placing to date.

In July 2019, the national broadcaster of Albania,  (RTSH), officially confirmed Albania's participation in the Eurovision Song Contest 2020 in Rotterdam, the Netherlands. RTSH broadcasts the contest within Albania and organises the selection process for the nation's entry. Since its debut in 2004, it has consistently selected its entry through the long-standing competition .

Before Eurovision

Festivali i Këngës 

The competition consisted of two semi-finals on 19 and 20 December, respectively, and the grand final on 22 December 2019. From May 2019 to September 2019, artists were able to submit their entries to the broadcaster.

Contestants

Shows

Semi-finals 

The semi-finals of  took place on 19 December and 20 December 2020 and were broadcast live at 21:00 (CET) on the respective dates. Ten songs competed in each semi-final with five entries in the first and seven in the second semi-final qualifying for the final. The qualifying songs were selected by a jury panel consisting of two national and three international members with connections to the Eurovision Song Contest. The jury panel was composed of Christer Björkman, Dimitris Kontopoulos, Felix Bergsson, Mikaela Minga and Rita Petro. The first semi-final was opened by the country's Eurovision Song Contest 2019 representative Jonida Maliqi performing her song "". The interval act included Mahmood performing his songs "" and "". The interval act in the second semi-final featured Agim Krajka and Lindita Theodhori with the song "". After the semi-finals, the votes of an expert jury panel selected twelve songs to advance to the grand final.

Final 

The grand final of  took place on 22 December 2019 and was broadcast live at 21:00 (CET). The final featured guest performances by Eleni Foureira and Giusy Ferreri. Twelve songs competed and the winner was determined by the combination of the votes from a five-member jury panel. Each member of the jury voted by assigning scores from 1–10, 13 and 18 points to their preferred songs. Before the end of the show, Arilena Ara emerged as the winner with "" and was simultaneously announced as Albania's representative for the Eurovision Song Contest 2020.

Promotion 
An accompanying lyric video for "Fall from the Sky" premiered on the official YouTube channel of the Eurovision Song Contest on 10 March 2019. For further promotion, Arilena was scheduled to embark on a small tour with live performances at various Eurovision Song Contest-related events, including in Amsterdam, London and Madrid, before the tour was cancelled due to the pandemic of the coronavirus disease 2019 (COVID-19). The first live performance of the song was broadcast during Arilena's Sounds of Silence concert at the Mother Teresa Square in Tirana on 2 May 2020 as well as the European Broadcasting Union's Eurovision Home Concerts series on 8 May 2020.

At Eurovision 

The Eurovision Song Contest 2020 was initially scheduled to take place at Rotterdam Ahoy in Rotterdam, Netherlands, and consist of two semi-finals on 12 and 14 May, and the grand final on 16 May 2020. In January, it was announced that Albania would be performing in the second half of the second semi-final of the contest. However, in March, the European Broadcasting Union (EBU) announced the contest's cancellation due to the COVID-19 pandemic in Europe. With respect to Arilena and her entry "Fall from the Sky" participating in the 2021 contest, the EBU announced soon after that entries intended for 2020 would not be eligible for the following year, though each broadcaster would be able to send either their 2020 representative or a new one.

Alternative song contests 

The broadcasters who were planned to take part in the Eurovision Song Contest 2020 organised alternative music competitions. Amongst them, Austrian broadcaster, ORF, organised  in April 2020, which saw every entry being assigned to one of three semi-finals. A jury, consisting of ten members that had represented  at the contest before, was hired to rank each song, with the highest-placed in each semi-final advancing to the final round. In the third semi-final on 18 April, Albania placed fourth in a field of thirteen participants, achieving a total of 62 points. Swedish broadcaster, Sveriges Television, additionally organised , in which Albania was scheduled to participate on 9 May 2020.

References 

2020
Countries in the Eurovision Song Contest 2020
Eurovision
Eurovision